Desmond Cambridge (born November 28, 1979) is an American basketball player who played for Alabama A&M from 1999 to 2002.

In 1999–2000, Cambridge averaged 5.9 points and 2.3 steals per game. In 2000–01, he averaged 18.6 points and led the Southwestern Athletic Conference with 3.8 steals per game. In 2001–02, Cambridge led the SWAC with 20.7 points per game. He set NCAA Division I season records for steals, with 160, and steals per game, with 5.52. He finished his college career with 330 steals. Cambridge scored a career-high 50 points in a game against Texas Southern on February 24, 2002 – a Southwestern Athletic Conference record at the time.

In 2005, Cambridge played for the Nashville Rhythm of the American Basketball Association.

See also
List of NCAA Division I men's basketball career steals leaders
List of NCAA Division I men's basketball season steals leaders

References

1979 births
Living people
Alabama A&M Bulldogs basketball players
American men's basketball players
Basketball players from Nashville, Tennessee
Point guards